Otto Quante (2 April 1875 in Minden/Westphalen – 20 February 1947 in Naumburg/Saale) was a German painter.

Quante initially studied ophthalmology.  However, he gave up his practice in 1907 and dedicated himself to painting, where he became especially famous for his portrayals of the day-to-day lives of vagabonds.

He studied art at the Malschule in Worpswede, the Badischen Landeskunstschule in Karlsruhe, and the Munich Art Academy.

Famous Works

 Frühlingstanz, (Springtime Dance)
 Fern vom Alltag, (Far from Everyday Life)
 Die Sorglosen, (The Carefree Ones)
 Im Frühling, (In the Spring)
 Die Lerche, (The Lark) L'Alouette

References

19th-century German painters
19th-century German male artists
German male painters
20th-century German painters
20th-century German male artists
1875 births
1947 deaths
Academy of Fine Arts, Munich alumni